Azelia Liu (born March 15, 1979 in Scarborough, Ontario) is a field hockey goalkeeper from Canada. She played for the country's national junior team before joining the senior team in 2002. In her career, Liu has participated in numerous international tournaments, including the 2006 and 2010 Commonwealth Games, 2003 and 2007 Pan American Games, and 2004 and 2009 Pan American Cup.

References

1979 births
Living people
Canadian female field hockey players
Canadian sportspeople of Chinese descent
Field hockey players at the 2006 Commonwealth Games
Sportspeople from Scarborough, Toronto
Commonwealth Games competitors for Canada